Grand Opera House may refer to:

Australia
Grand Opera House, Sydney

Canada
Grand Opera House (Toronto)

France
Palais Garnier in Paris, often called the "Grand Opera House"

Philippines
Manila Grand Opera House

United Kingdom
Grand Opera House, Belfast, Northern Ireland
Grand Opera House, York, England

United States
Alphabetical by state, then city
Grand Opera House (Los Angeles), California
Grand Opera House (San Francisco), California
Grand Opera House (Pueblo, Colorado), designed by Adler & Sullivan
Grand Opera House (Wilmington, Delaware), NRHP-listed
Degive's Grand Opera House, Atlanta, Georgia, NRHP-listed
Grand Opera House (Macon, Georgia), NRHP-listed
Beardstown Grand Opera House, Beardstown, Illinois, NRHP-listed
Grand Opera House (Dubuque, Iowa), NRHP-listed
Ford's Grand Opera House, Baltimore, Maryland
Grand Opera House (Boston), Massachusetts
Grand Opera House (St. James, Minnesota), NRHP-listed
Grand Opera House (Meridian, Mississippi), NRHP-listed
Grand Opera House (Manhattan), New York City
Vale Hotel and Grand Opera House, Vale, Oregon, NRHP-listed
Grand 1894 Opera House (Galveston, Texas), NRHP-listed
Grand Opera House (Uvalde, Texas), NRHP-listed
Grand Opera House (Seattle), Washington
Grand Opera House (Ashland, Wisconsin)
Oshkosh Grand Opera House, Wisconsin, NRHP-listed